In molecular biology, TCL-1/MTCP-1 is a protein domain found in proteins encoded for by two related protooncogenes, other words by genes that help promote cancer. They are, T-cell leukemia/lymphoma protein 1A TCL1A encoded by oncogene TCL-1 SWISSPROT and Protein p13 MTCP-1 encoded by MTCP-1 SWISSPROT.

These are overexpressed in T cell prolymphocytic leukemias as a result of chromosomal rearrangements that involve the translocation of one T cell receptor gene to either chromosome 14q32 or Xq28.

Function
Enhances the phosphorylation and activation of Akt. Once Akt is activated this will in turn trigger cell survival. Further more it helps to  stabilise  mitochondrial membrane potential.

Structure
This protein exists as a homodimer. It interacts with AKT1, AKT2 and AKT3 via  the PH protein domain. It interacts with PNPT1; the interaction has no effect on PNPT1 exonuclease activity.

References

Protein families
Protein domains